This is the discography of American rap group, Tha Dogg Pound.

Albums

Studio albums

Compilation albums

Instrumental albums

Mixtapes
DPGC: Back In Business (hosted by DJ Nik Bean) (2006)
Full Circle (Dogg Pound Gangsta Grillz) (hosted by DJ Drama) (2008)
DPGC'Ology (hosted by DJ Nik Bean) (2012)
That's My Work Volume 1 (with Snoop Dogg) (2012)
That's My Work Volume 5 (with Snoop Dogg) (2014)

Extended plays

Singles

A.  Did not chart on the Hot R&B/Hip-Hop chart (Billboard rules at the time prevented album cuts from charting). Chart peak listed here represents Hot R&B/Hip-Hop Airplay charts data.

Guest appearances

Tha Dogg Pound songs on members' solo albums

Daz Dillinger
Retaliation, Revenge and Get Back
"Gang Bangin' Ass Criminal" (also featuring Soopafly, Tray Deee, Bad Azz, Techniec)
"It's Going Down"
"Our Daily Bread"
"Initiated" (also featuring 2Pac and Outlawz)
R.A.W.
"I'd Rather Lie 2 Ya" (also featuring Tray Deee)
"On tha Grind" (later appeared on Kurupt's Space Boogie: Smoke Oddessey as "On da Grind")
"R.A.W."
"Feels Good" (also featuring LaToiya Williams)
"My System" (also featuring Tha Mactress)
Game for Sale (with JT the Bigga Figga)
"Change the Game" (also featuring Jay-Z)
This Is the Life I Lead
"Gangsta's Prerogative" (also featuring Roscoe)
"For the Moment"
So So Gangsta
"Money on My Mind"
Gangsta Party
"Gettin' Money" (also featuring E-40)
Only on the Left Side
"Thiz How We Live"
Matter of Dayz
"Matter of Dayz"
"X'posed 2 tha Game"
D.A.Z.
"My Homegirl"

Kurupt
Kuruption 
"Make Some Noize"
"Fresh"
Tha Streetz Iz a Mutha
"Loose Cannons" (also featuring Xzibit)
"Who Ride wit Us"
"Represent Dat G.C." (also featuring Snoop Dogg, Soopafly, Tray Deee, Jayo Felony, Butch Cassidy)
"Tequila" (also featuring T-Moe, Nivea)
"Tha Streetz Iz a Mutha" (also featuring Big Pimpin')
"Ya Can't Trust Nobody"
"Your Gyrl Friend"
"I Ain't Shit Without My Homeboyz" (also featuring Soopafly, Crooked I, Baby S)
Space Boogie: Smoke Oddessey
"On da Grind" (appeared earlier on Daz Dillinger's R.A.W. as "On tha Grind")
"Gangstaz"
"Da World"
Same Day, Different Shit
"As Time Fly By"
"Gangstaz Part 2"
"Ain't That Somethin'"
The Frank and Jess Story (with Roscoe)
"Game Been Missin'"
"All I Need"
"Smashin'"
Streetlights
"I'm Burnt"
"In Gotti We Trust"
"Questions"
"Yessir"

References

Hip hop discographies
Discographies of American artists